The Doran River is a river in the Unorganized Part of Thunder Bay District in Northwestern Ontario, Canada. The river is part of the James Bay drainage basin and is a tributary of Lake St. Joseph.

The river begins at an unnamed lake and flows southeast to Doran Lake. It heads northeast through Thelma Lake, and reaches its mouth at Lake St. Joseph, the source of the Albany River, which flows to James Bay.

References

Sources

Rivers of Thunder Bay District